The Tinip River is a river of New Caledonia. It has a catchment area of 12 square kilometres. Tinip River is located between Katavilli Bay and Gomen Bay.

See also
List of rivers of New Caledonia

References

Rivers of New Caledonia